The Bolshaya Vaya is a river in Perm Krai, Russia, a right tributary of Vishera which in turn is a tributary of Kama. The mouth of the river is located near the settlement of Vaya.

References 

Rivers of Perm Krai